The Italdesign GTZERO is an electric shooting-brake concept produced by Italian design company Italdesign Giugiaro and showcased at the 2016 Geneva Motor Show.

Performance 
The GTZERO is powered by three electric motors, two in the front and one in the rear, and is all-wheel drive.

Features 
The GTZERO is built on a modular carbon fiber monocoque, which Italdesign says houses the batteries and allows for multiple body styles to be used. The chassis also features aluminum front and rear subframes. a lightweight composite body, butterfly doors and four wheel steering with 5 degrees of steering angle. The interior features configurable seating which can be changed from a 2+2 to a 3+1 arrangement as well as multiple touchscreens to control interior functions.

References

 
Italdesign Giugiaro

Electric vehicles
Italdesign concept vehicles
All-wheel-drive vehicles